Ivory "Wayne" Underwood (December 8, 1913 – October 26, 1967) was an American football tackle who played one season with the Cleveland Rams of the National Football League. He played college football at Marshall University.

Professional career
Underwood played in three games for the Cleveland Rams in 1937.

Personal life
Underwood went on to become a high school football coach and head of the physical education department at Calhoun County High School in Grantsville, West Virginia, He is a member of the West Virginia Sportswriters Hall of Fame and the Coach Of the Year Award in the Little Kanawha Conference is named after him. He died of a heart attack on October 26, 1967.

References

External links

1913 births
1967 deaths
Players of American football from West Virginia
American football tackles
Marshall Thundering Herd football players
Cleveland Rams players
High school football coaches in West Virginia
People from West Union, West Virginia
People from Grantsville, West Virginia